Bergens Stiftstidende was a Norwegian newspaper, published in Bergen.

Bergens Stiftstidende was started in 1840. It went defunct in 1855. Editors were Hans Holmboe and the priest Peter Albert Sagen.

References

Defunct newspapers published in Norway
Newspapers published in Bergen
Newspapers established in 1840
Publications disestablished in 1855